Easy Come, Easy Go is a 1947 American comedy film  directed by John Farrow and starring Barry Fitzgerald, Diana Lynn and Sonny Tufts. It was produced and distributed by Hollywood studio Paramount Pictures.

Plot
Martin Donovan's compulsive gambling leaves him constantly broke and under arrest from a gambling-house raid. He also places bets for tenants of his boardinghouse, who lose their money and ability to pay the rent.

Martin's daughter, Connie, is courted by cabbie Kevin O'Connor and cop Dale Whipple while her dad fears losing her. Kevin wins her heart, but loses every cent due to taking Martin's betting advice. When the two men are arrested, a disgusted Connie bails them out but leaves Kevin for the more responsible Dale.

Tim Donovan, brother of Martin, has a job with the police as a diver. He and Martin come upon a sunken treasure, but Martin, whose philosophy is "easy come, easy go," promptly squanders all the loot. Not knowing what else to do, Connie tries to solve her dad's debts by taking bets on a horse race. Dale ends up arresting her. The horse wins, but it takes a car accident for Martin to finally see the light and the error of his ways.

Cast

References

External links
Easy Come Easy Go at TCMDB
Easy Come, Easy Go at IMDb

1947 films
1947 comedy films
American drama films
American black-and-white films
Films scored by Roy Webb
Films directed by John Farrow
Films set in New York City
Paramount Pictures films
1940s English-language films
1940s American films
Films with screenplays by Francis Edward Faragoh
American films about gambling